Fernando Luis Aristeguieta de Luca (born 9 April 1992) is a Venezuelan professional footballer who plays for Liga MX club Puebla and the Venezuela national team as a striker.

Aristeguieta began his professional career with Caracas in 2009 and stayed at the club until 2013. At age 20, he was the top goalscorer in the Torneo Apertura 2012, scoring 14 goals. In his first season in France, he helped his team Nantes to achieve promotion to Ligue 1 in the 2012–13 season.

He is the only player in history who has scored a hat-trick in the Venezuelan Clásico, which is played between the two most popular teams in the country: Caracas and Deportivo Táchira. He also became the first Venezuelan player in history to score a goal in Ligue 1 of France. He was the first player to score a goal for Mazatlán after its foundation in June 2020.

Aristeguieta has played for the Venezuela national team since 2010.

Early life

School
He studied at the Colegio San Ignacio de Loyola. He also managed to represent their school in Recreational Mathematics Olympics five times, in which he was the runner up in 2006. In the summer of 2007 and 2008 he studied English at the Cushing Academy institution, located in the city of Ashburnham, Massachusetts, achieving complete mastery of the language. During these years, he took the decision to leave school in order to fully focus on soccer, causing quarrels with his parents. Aristeguieta wanted to graduate in a school for athletes; however, he decided to finish at his school. He graduated in July 2010.

Sports

At age 7, he joined the Loyola football team, being coached by former Caracas and Venezuela national team player Leopoldo Páez, who Aristeguieta considers his mentor both on and off the pitch. Simultaneously he was practicing tennis, participating in tournaments at regional, national and international levels. In that list, was leader David Souto, who is currently in first place in the ranking of Venezuelan men's professional tennis. However, in the same year of publication, Aristeguieta decided to retire from tennis to specialize in football.

As a soccer player, he represented his school in Caracas Sports School League and the League César Del Vecchio. He also played in several international championships in European cities such as Barcelona, Gothenburg, Regina, Milan, San Sebastián and Dallas. At 15 he left Loyola to join the football team Centro Ítalo Venezolano.

Club career

Caracas
In his first year at the club he managed to win the U-17 National Championship in the 2007-2008 season, being the top goalscorer with 21 goals. Aristeguieta turned down offers from teams like Tenerife, Real Oviedo, and Grêmio to continue his studies.
 
He debuted in the first division in Venezuela with Caracas in the 2009/2010 season. In his first season, he played 20 games and scored 6 times, scoring his first professional goal on his debut against Trujillanos, in the city of Valera, on 16 August 2009. On 10 March 2010, he had his international tournament debut, coming in at the 77th min. for Rafael Castellín, in the 2010 Copa Libertadores match against Flamengo, which Caracas lost 1-3 at home; that game was the last of Noel Sanvicente coaching the club.

On 30 July 2010 he suffered a ruptured cruciate ligament in his left knee that would keep him sidelined nine months, missing the Copa Sudamericana 2011 and the 2011 South American U-20 Championship.

First division of Venezuela in the season of 2011/2012 was the rebirth of the redhead forward, which few expected after his painful injury. In the first round against Trujillanos FC, he played 26 minutes. He makes his first goal of the season against the Football Club Tucanes Amazon in New Haven when he had entered 67 minutes, from there he was awarded with being a starter. The next match against Llaneros de Guanare Futbol Club he scored two goals. This game was played over two days due to power failure. The next day he repeated the feat at Mineros de Guayana in the Olympic Stadium UCV to score two of the four goals that the Nerazzurri embedded computer, the next 2 days and also scored a run and managed 4 consecutive days scoring. From there, the front began to be recognized and loved by the Reds fans before the game occasionally chanted "Aristeguieta, Aristeguieta". Having already spent a long injury of 9 months, he was still having knee problems since in season 2 occasions received short-term injuries. In the Torneo Clausura 2012, he scored only 4 goals. At this time he was very critical of the low production of plays in attack and the lack of scoring. They had to settle for finishing second in the standings.

For the 2012/2013 season, reinforcements were sought in the offense, with the Uruguayan Rino Lucas, Chilean Sebastián González and around Daniel Febles, the performance of Aristeguieta was dented in the biggest games for the arrival of two foreign players. It opens in the network on August 29 against Atlético Miranda in the 2012 Copa Venezuela. The poor performances of Chilean striker in the first games of the season Aristeguieta helped win more opportunities. In the second leg against Atletico Miranda he scores 2 goals and classified with an overall 7-6. He Scores the third double of his career on October 21, 2012 versus Real Esppor Club. On the 18th of the following month, an excellent performance curdles when getting his first hat-trick to the Llaneros de Guanare, a fundamental part as the team managed to win 4-1. Repeat this action on December 9 against Deportivo Táchira in Sports Pueblo Nuevo and being the only player that Caracas has scored three goals against his archrival. He finished the Torneo Apertura 2012 ( Venezuela) as a leader in the scoring by scoring 14 goals that helped his team not to pass the second place.

Nantes
After passing the medical and psychological exams, on 10 January 2013 he signed a six-month contract on loan with FC Nantes of the French Ligue 2. He did not count towards the club's quota of non-EU players due to being a dual Venezuelan-Spanish citizen (coming from a family of Basque origin).

He made his debut on 19 January, entering in the 87th minute of the match against Stade Lavallois Mayenne FC. Within minutes he had the opportunity to make a header, but the ball went just inches from the corner. He debuted as a starter on 22 January in the French Cup against SAS Epinal, which finished with a 1-1 draw.

On 12 February 2013 he scored two goals in the match against Le Mans FC. The first came in the 7th minute after a deep cross from the left which Aristeguieta controlled with his chest and then finished with a half volley into the bottom right. The second came off a deflected pass which he shot first time with his left foot into the roof of the net. On 15 April he scores his first hat trick with the French team at the Berrichonne Chateauroux. In addition to this, he also caused the second yellow card of a rival. Eleven days later he scores the only goal of the match against Chamois Niortais F.C. On 16 May, Aristeguieta was elected the best player of the month of April with 46% of the vote. On 17 May Nantes secured promotion to the Ligue 1 after beating CS Sedan

Nantes FC gave the option to buy him for 1.2 million euros, extending the contract for 3 years. He was given the number 10 and also shared a room with Venezuelans Gabriel Cichero and Oswaldo Vizcarrondo, who had been photographed with Aristeguieta in his first training with the senior team of Caracas Futbol Club.

On 28 November 2014, after being sparingly used by Nantes, Aristeguieta moved to La Liga's Getafe CF, on loan until June. On 7 January 2015 he passed a medical in the Madrid outskirts club, but his loan was cancelled on the 31st.

Philadelphia Union (loan)
On February 20, 2015, it was confirmed that Aristeguieta had joined Major League Soccer side Philadelphia Union on loan.

Caracas
In July 2017, Aristeguieta returned to Caracas and signed a 1.5-year deal.

International career

Youth level
He began his involvement in the Venezuelan selection in the U-15 category to compete in the 2007 South American U-15 Championship played in Porto Alegre. Aristeguieta managed to be the top scorer of his team with three goals. Venezuela narrowly missed out on qualifying to the second round due to goal difference.

He was present in 48 friendly matches of the U-17 level in preparation for the 2009 U-17 South American League the city of Iquique, where the team finished in last place in their group. He also participated in Bolivarian Games of 2009 scoring 1 goal in that tournament and the Venezuela National Team won the bronze medal.

Senior Team
Aristigueta made his senior team debut on 2 February 2010 against Japan with the number 7 and was replaced by Alexander Rondon after 70 minutes. He was again called up for the friendly against Chile on 31 March, playing 8 minutes in the last game of the Marcelo Bielsa era.

He was subsequently called up for the match against El Salvador, the first after the 2011 Copa America, and scored a goal, thanks to an assist from Yonathan Del Valle.

On 7 October 2011, he made his competitive debut on the first matchday of the 2014 FIFA World Cup qualifiers against Ecuador at Estadio Olímpico Atahualpa in Quito. After a year without playing for the national team, he played five minutes on 14 November 2012 against Nigeria.

On 27 March 2013, He started against rivals Colombia. Wearing the number 9, he had two clear chances, including a possible goal, which was blocked off the goal line by a Colombian defender. Eventually his team won 1-0 at the Cachamay Stadium.

Personal life 
He got married in 2017 with Linden Azcunes. They have one child together, a son, Lucas Ezio Aristeguieta, born on June 6, 2019. In July 2020 they announced that they are expecting a girl named Sofía Alexandra.

Club statistics
Accurate as of 27 July 2016

International goals

|-
| 1. || 7 August 2011 || Robert F. Kennedy, Washington, United States ||  || align=center | 1–0 || align=center | 2–1 || Friendly ||
|}

Honours
Caracas
 Venezuelan First Division: 2009–10
 Copa Venezuela: 2009

References

External links
 FC Nantes official profile  
 
 

1992 births
Living people
Footballers from Caracas
Venezuelan people of Basque descent
Venezuelan footballers
Association football forwards
Ligue 1 players
Ligue 2 players
Major League Soccer players
Primeira Liga players
Categoría Primera A players
Venezuelan Primera División players
Liga MX players
Designated Players (MLS)
Caracas FC players
FC Nantes players
Philadelphia Union players
C.D. Nacional players
América de Cali footballers
Atlético Morelia players
Venezuelan expatriate footballers
Venezuelan expatriate sportspeople in the United States
Venezuelan expatriate sportspeople in France
Expatriate footballers in France
Expatriate soccer players in the United States
Expatriate footballers in Mexico
Venezuela international footballers
2021 Copa América players